Below is a list of mayors of Anaheim, California since its incorporation in 1870.

See also
 Timeline of Anaheim, California

Notes
1. E. H. Metcalf was recalled by the voters of the City of Anaheim on February 3, 1925.
2. Resigned.

External links
Past Anaheim City Officials - Official list from the City of Anaheim

 
Anaheim
 Mayors
Mayor
M